Stvolová is a municipality and village in Blansko District in the South Moravian Region of the Czech Republic. It has about 200 inhabitants. It lies on the Svitava River.

Administrative parts
Villages of Skřib and Vlkov are administrative parts of Stvolová.

References

Villages in Blansko District